Simba is an album by American jazz guitarist O'Donel Levy recorded in 1973 and released on the Groove Merchant label the following year.

Reception 

Allmusic's Sean Westergaard said: "Simba is one hot album of funky soul-jazz. ... The songs are catchy and funky, and play to Levy's strengths as a player. The arrangements are fantastic, played by a who's who list of '70s session men ... Simba is the O'Donel Levy album to own".

Track listing
All compositions by Manny Albam except where noted
 "Bad, Bad Simba" – 7:15
 "Kilimanjaro Cookout" – 4:56
 "Playhouse" (Manny Albam, O'Donel Levy) – 4:41
 "Sierra Lonely" – 5:37
 "Sad, Sad, Simba" – 6:08
 "Joni" (Levy) – 5:12
 "Nigerian Knights" (Levy) – 5:09

Personnel
O'Donel Levy – guitar
Eddie Daniels – flute, piccolo, baritone saxophone
Jon Faddis, Ernie Royal – trumpet
Burt Collins, Lew Soloff – flugelhorn, trumpet
Cecil Bridgewater, Alan Rubin – flugelhorn
Bill Watrous – trombone
Warren Bernhardt – electric piano
Tony Levin – bass
Steve Gadd – drums
Manny Albam – arranger

References

Groove Merchant albums
O'Donel Levy albums
1974 albums
Albums produced by Sonny Lester
Albums arranged by Manny Albam